Preedy is a surname. Notable people with the surname include:

 Bob Preedy (born 20th century), British broadcaster and author
 Charlie Preedy (1900–1978), English footballer
 Cyril Preedy (1920–1965), English pianist
 Frederick Preedy (1820–1898), English architect and glass painter
 Malcolm Preedy (born 1960), English rugby union player
 Tiverton Preedy (1863–1928), English clergyman